Rhizoprionodon is a genus of requiem sharks, and part of the family Carcharhinidae, commonly known as sharpnose sharks because of their long, pointed snouts.

Species
 Rhizoprionodon acutus (Rüppell, 1837) (milk shark)
 Rhizoprionodon lalandii (J. P. Müller & Henle, 1839) (Brazilian sharpnose shark)
 Rhizoprionodon longurio (D. S. Jordan & C. H. Gilbert, 1882) (Pacific sharpnose shark)
 Rhizoprionodon oligolinx V. G. Springer, 1964 (grey sharpnose shark)
 Rhizoprionodon porosus (Poey, 1861) (Caribbean sharpnose shark)
 Rhizoprionodon taylori (Ogilby, 1915) (Australian sharpnose shark)
 Rhizoprionodon terraenovae (J. Richardson, 1836) (Atlantic sharpnose shark)

See also

 List of sharks
 List of prehistoric cartilaginous fish genera

References

 
Extant Ypresian first appearances
Shark genera
Taxa named by Gilbert Percy Whitley